William Dundas (1762–1845) was a Scottish politician.

The son of Robert Dundas, of Arniston, the younger, he became a barrister at Lincoln's Inn in 1788.  He was member of parliament (MP) for the Anstruther Burghs from 1794 to 1796, for the Northern Burghs from 1796 to 1802, for Sutherland in 1802 and 1806, for Cullen in 1810 and Edinburgh from 1812 to 1831.

He appointed a Privy Counsellor in 1800 and was Secretary at War from 1804 to 1806. He was a Lord Commissioner of the Admiralty in 1812. He was appointed Keeper of the Signet in 1814 and Lord Clerk Register in 1821.

References

External links 
 

1762 births
1845 deaths
Lords of the Admiralty
Members of the Parliament of Great Britain for Scottish constituencies
British MPs 1790–1796
British MPs 1796–1800
Scottish Tory MPs (pre-1912)
Members of the Parliament of the United Kingdom for Highland constituencies
UK MPs 1801–1802
UK MPs 1802–1806
UK MPs 1806–1807
UK MPs 1807–1812
UK MPs 1812–1818
UK MPs 1818–1820
UK MPs 1820–1826
UK MPs 1826–1830
UK MPs 1830–1831
William Dundas
Members of the Parliament of the United Kingdom for Edinburgh constituencies